Someday My Prince Will Come is the seventh studio album by Miles Davis for Columbia Records, catalogue CL 1656 and CS 8456 in stereo, released in 1961. Recorded at Columbia's 30th Street Studio in Manhattan, New York City, it marked the only Miles Davis Quintet studio recording session to feature saxophonist Hank Mobley.

Background
Keeping to his standard procedure at Columbia to date of alternating small group records and big band studio projects with Gil Evans, Davis followed up Sketches of Spain with an album by his working quintet. In 1960, however, the jazz world had been in flux. Although Davis had garnered acclaim for Kind of Blue, the entrance of Ornette Coleman and free jazz via his Fall 1959 residency at the Five Spot Café and his albums for Atlantic Records had created controversy, and turned attention away from Davis.

Production
Similarly, Davis' touring band had been in flux. In 1959, Cannonball Adderley left to form his own group with his brother, reducing the sextet to a quintet. Drummer Jimmy Cobb and pianist Wynton Kelly had been hired in 1958, but most difficult for Davis was the departure of John Coltrane, who stayed on for a spring tour of Europe but left to form his own quartet in the summer of 1960. In 1960, Davis went through saxophonists Jimmy Heath and Sonny Stitt before settling on Hank Mobley in December, the band re-stabilizing for the next two years.

Composition
Unlike Kind of Blue, which featured nothing but group originals, this album paired equal numbers of Miles Davis tunes and pop standards, including the title song resurrected from the 1937 Disney film Snow White and the Seven Dwarfs. The titles to all three Davis originals refer to specific individuals: "Pfrancing" to his wife Frances, featured on the album cover; "Teo" to his producer Teo Macero; and "Drad Dog" (Goddard reversed) to Columbia Records president Goddard Lieberson. While the cover credits the Miles Davis Sextet, only the title track featured six players, Coltrane making two cameo appearances on the album, taking solos on the title track and "Teo", playing instead of Mobley on the latter. On March 21, ex-Davis drummer Philly Joe Jones made his final contribution to a Davis session, replacing Cobb for the original "Blues No. 2", which was not used on the album.

Re-issue
On June 8, 1999, Legacy Records reissued the album for compact disc with two bonus tracks including the unused "Blues No. 2" and an alternative take of "Someday My Prince Will Come".

Critical reception 

In a contemporary review for Down Beat, Ira Gitler praised Coltrane's solo on the title track while finding Kelly equally exceptional as both a soloist and comping musician. "His single-lines are simultaneously hard and soft. Cobb and Chambers groove perfectly together and with Kelly", Gitler wrote. "The rhythm section, individually and as a whole, is very well-recorded." The magazine's Howard Mandel later viewed Someday My Prince Will Come as "a commercial realization rather than an artistic exploration" but nonetheless "lovely", highlighted by each musicians' careful attention to notes and dynamics, and among Davis' most "romantic, bluesy and intentionally seductive programs".

The album is ranked number 994 in All-Time Top 1000 Albums (3rd edition, 2000).

Track listing

 Sides one and two were combined as tracks 1–6 on CD reissues.

Personnel

Musicians
 Miles Davis – trumpet
 Hank Mobley – tenor saxophone on all tracks except "Teo"
 John Coltrane – tenor saxophone on "Someday My Prince Will Come" (master) and "Teo"
 Wynton Kelly – piano
 Paul Chambers – bass
 Jimmy Cobb – drums all tracks except "Blues No. 2"
 Philly Joe Jones – drums on "Blues No. 2"

Production
 Teo Macero – producer
 Fred Plaut, Frank Laico – engineers
 Bob Cato – album cover design
 Frances Davis – cover model
 Michael Cuscuna, Bob Belden – reissue producers
 Mark Wilder – digital remastering engineer
 Seth Rothstein – reissue project coordinator
 Howard Fritzson – reissue art direction
 Eddie Henderson – reissue liner notes

See also 
 Love Songs (Miles Davis album)
 Dave Digs Disney-Dave Brubeck's 1957 album consisting of Disney songs

References

External links
Someday My Prince Will Come at AllMusic

1961 albums
Miles Davis albums
Albums produced by Teo Macero
Columbia Records albums
Albums recorded at CBS 30th Street Studio
Instrumental albums